A Nine-Dragon Wall or Nine-Dragon Screen is a type of screen wall with reliefs of nine different Chinese dragons. Such walls are typically found in imperial Chinese palaces and gardens.

Early reference to the tradition of putting a screen wall at the gate is found in the Analects, 3:22: therein, it is mentioned as a trivial ritual norm ("The princes of States have a screen intercepting the view at their gates". 邦君樹塞門, trans. by James Legge).

List of Nine-Dragon Walls
Nine-Dragon Walls in China:
 Beihai Park, Beijing. Built in 1756, it features dragons on both sides.
 Forbidden City, Beijing. Built in 1771, it is located in front of the Palace of Tranquil Longevity.
 Datong, opposite the Datong Prince's Palace
 Pingyao
 Hong Kong
Public Square Street Rest Garden, Yau Ma Tei. Located at the back of the Tin Hau Temple.
Wong Tai Sin Temple
China Resources Building, Wan Chai District (removed at the time of the extension of the building)

Outside China (partial):
 Chinese Garden, Edmonton, Canada, Stone-carved and largest in North America. Located at the Chinese Garden at Louise McKinney Park. Began construction in 2019, open to public in 2021, finishing ornamental touches and donor plaques being added in Fall 2022. The back of the wall depicts the Great Wall of China.
 Haw Par Villa, Singapore
 Chinatown, Chicago, Built in 2003, it is a miniature reproduction of the wall in Beihai Park, Beijing. 
Mississauga Chinese Centre, Mississauga, Canada

References

See also

 9 (number)
 Nine Dragons (disambiguation)
Spirit screen
Chinese architecture 
Loong

Chinese dragons
Walls
Traditional Chinese architecture
Spirit screens